Kiribati, officially the Republic of Kiribati, is an island country in Oceania in the Central Pacific Ocean. Its permanent population is over 119,000 (2020), more than half of whom live on Tarawa atoll. The state comprises 32 atolls and one remote raised coral island, Banaba.

The islands' spread straddles the equator and the 180th meridian, although the International Date Line goes around Kiribati and swings far to the east, almost reaching 150°W. This brings Kiribati's easternmost islands, the southern Line Islands south of Hawaii, into the same day as the Gilbert Islands and places them in the most advanced time zone on Earth: UTC+14.

Kiribati gained its independence from the United Kingdom, becoming a sovereign state in 1979. The capital, South Tarawa, now the most populated area, consists of a number of islets, connected by a series of causeways. These comprise about half the area of Tarawa Atoll. Prior to its independence, the country had exported phosphate, but those mines are no longer viable with fisheries and export of copra driving much of the economy. Kiribati is one of the least developed countries in the world and is highly dependent on international aid for its economy.

Kiribati is a member of the Pacific Community, Commonwealth of Nations, the International Monetary Fund, the World Bank, and the Organisation of African, Caribbean and Pacific States, and became a full member of the United Nations in 1999. As an island nation, the islands are vulnerable to climate change, so addressing climate change has been a central part of its international policy, as a member of the Alliance of Small Island States.

Etymology and pronunciation
The name is pronounced , Kiribass, as -ti in the Gilbertese language represents an s sound. Similarly, the name of its people, the I-Kiribati, is pronounced as e-Kiribass.

The name "Kiribati" was adopted in 1979 at independence. It is the Gilbertese rendition of Gilberts, the plural of the English name of the nation's main archipelago, the Gilbert Islands. It was named îles Gilbert (French for Gilbert Islands) in about 1820 by Russian admiral Adam von Krusenstern and French captain Louis Duperrey, after the British captain Thomas Gilbert. Gilbert and captain John Marshall sighted some of the islands in 1788, while crossing the "outer passage" route from Port Jackson to Canton. Both von Krusenstern's and Duperrey's maps, published in 1824, were written in French. In French, the Northern Islands were until then called îles Mulgrave and Byron Island was not part of them.

In English, the archipelago, particularly the southern part, was often referred to as the Kingsmills in the 19th century, although the name Gilbert Islands was used increasingly, including in the Western Pacific Order in Council of 1877 and in the Pacific Order of 1893.

The name Gilbert, already in the name of the British protectorate since 1892, was incorporated into the name of the entire Gilbert and Ellice Islands Colony (GEIC) from 1916 and was retained after the Ellice Islands became the separate nation of Tuvalu in 1976. The spelling of Gilberts in the Gilbertese language as Kiribati may be found in books in Gilbertese prepared by missionaries, but with the meaning of Gilbertese (demonym and language) (see e.g., Hawaiian Board of Missionaries, 1895).

The indigenous name often suggested for the Gilbert Islands proper is Tungaru (see e.g., 1952–1953, or Arthur Grimble, 1989). The rendition Kiribati for Gilberts was chosen as the official name of the new independent nation by the chief minister, Sir Ieremia Tabai and his cabinet, on such grounds that it was modern, and to comprehend the inclusion of outer islands (e.g., the Phoenix Group and Line Islands), which were not considered part of the Tungaru (or Gilberts) chain.

History

Early history 
The area now called Kiribati, mainly the 16 Gilbert Islands, has been inhabited by Austronesian peoples speaking the same Oceanic language, from north to south, including the southernmost Nui, since sometime between 3000 BCE and  1300 CE. The area was not completely isolated; later, voyagers from Samoa, Tonga, and Fiji introduced some Polynesian and Melanesian cultural aspects, respectively. Intermarriage and intense navigation between the islands tended to blur cultural differences and resulted in a significant degree of cultural homogenization. Local oral historians chiefly in the form of lore keepers suggest that the area was first inhabited by a group of seafaring people from Melanesia, who were described as being dark-skinned, frizzy-haired, and short in stature. These indigenous peoples were then visited by early Austronesian seafarers from the west, a place called Matang, orally described as being tall and fair-skinned. Eventually, both groups intermittently clashed and intermingled until they slowly became a uniform population.

Around 1300 CE, a mass exodus occurred from Samoa at the same time that cannibalism was forcefully abolished there, leading to the addition of Polynesian ancestry into the mix of most Gilbertese people. These Samoans later brought strong features of Polynesian languages and culture, creating clans based on their own Samoan traditions and slowly intertwining with the indigenous clans and powers already dominant in Kiribati. Around the 15th century, starkly contrasting systems of governance arose between the northern islands, primarily under chiefly rule (uea), and the central and southern islands, primarily under the rule of their council of elders (unimwaane). Tabiteuea could be an exception as the sole island that is known as maintaining a traditional egalitarian society. The name Tabiteuea stems from the root phrase Tabu-te-Uea, meaning "chiefs are forbidden". Civil war soon became a factor, with acquisition of land being the main form of conquest. Clans and chiefs began fighting over resources, fueled by hatred and reignited blood feuds, which may have started months, years, or even decades before.

The turmoil lasted well into the European visitation and colonial era, which led to certain islands decimating their foes with the help of guns and cannon-equipped ships that some Europeans were coerced into using by the more cunning and persuasive among the I-Kiribati leaders. The typical military arms of the I-Kiribati at this time were shark tooth-embedded wooden spears, knives, and swords, and garbs of armour fashioned from dense coconut fibre. They chiefly used these instead of the gunpowder and weapons of steel available at the time, because of the strong sentimental value of the equipment handed down through generations. Ranged weapons, such as bows, slings, and javelins, were seldom used; hand-to-hand combat was a prominent skill still practised today, though seldom mentioned because of various taboos associated with it, secrecy being the primary one. Abemama's High Chief Tembinok' was the last of the dozens of expansionist chiefs of Gilbert Islands of this period, despite Abemama historically conforming to the traditional southern islands' governance of their respective unimwaane. He was immortalised in Robert Louis Stevenson's book In the South Seas, which delved into the high chief's character and method of rule during Stevenson's stay in Abemama. The 90th anniversary of his arrival in the Gilbert Islands was chosen to celebrate the independence of Kiribati on 12 July 1979.

Colonial era

Chance visits by European ships occurred in the 17th and 18th centuries, while those ships attempted circumnavigations of the world, or sought sailing routes from the south to north Pacific Ocean. A passing trade, whaling the On-The-Line grounds, and labour ships associated with blackbirding of Kanakas workers, visited the islands in large numbers during the 19th century, with social, economic, political, religious and cultural consequences. More than 9,000 workers were sent abroad from 1845 to 1895, most of them not returning.

The passing trade gave rise to European, Chinese, Samoan, and other residents from the 1830s; they included beachcombers, castaways, traders, and missionaries.

In 1886, an Anglo-German agreement partitioned the "unclaimed" central Pacific, leaving Nauru in the German sphere of influence, while Ocean Island and the future GEIC wound up in the British sphere of influence. In 1892, local Gilbertese authorities (an uea, a chief from the Northern Gilbert Group, and atun te boti or head of clan) on each of the Gilbert Islands agreed to Captain E.H.M. Davis commanding HMS Royalist of the Royal Navy declaring them part of a British protectorate, along with the nearby Ellice Islands. They were administered by a resident commissioner based first on Makin Islands (1893–95), then in Betio, Tarawa (1896–1908) and Ocean Island (1908–1942), protectorate who was under the Western Pacific High Commission based in Fiji. Banaba, known to Europeans as Ocean Island, was added to the protectorate in 1900, because of the phosphate rock of its soil (discovered in 1900). This discovery and the mining ended the contracting of Kanakas workers to farm plantations in Queensland, German Samoa or Central America, with all the needed workers being used in Ocean Island extraction.

The conduct of William Telfer Campbell, the second resident commissioner of the Gilberts and Ellice Islands of 1896 to 1908, was criticised as to his legislative, judicial and administrative management (including allegations of forced labour exacted from islanders) and became the subject of the 1909 report by Arthur Mahaffy. In 1913, an anonymous correspondent to The New Age newspaper described the maladministration of W. Telfer Campbell and questioned the partiality of Arthur Mahaffy, because he was a former colonial official in the Gilberts. The anonymous correspondent also criticised the operations of the Pacific Phosphate Company on Ocean Island.

The islands became the crown colony of the Gilbert and Ellice Islands in 1916. The Northern Line Islands, including Christmas Island (Kiritimati), were added to the colony in 1919, and the Phoenix Islands were added in 1937 with the purpose of a Phoenix Islands Settlement Scheme. On 12 July 1940, Pan Am Airways' American Clipper landed at Canton Island for the first time during a flight from Honolulu to Auckland.

Sir Arthur Grimble was a cadet administrative officer based at Tarawa (1913–1919) and became Resident Commissioner of the Gilbert and Ellice Islands colony in 1926.

In 1902, the Pacific Cable Board laid the first trans-Pacific telegraph cable from Bamfield, British Columbia to Fanning Island (Tabuaeran) in the Line Islands, and from Fiji to Fanning Island, thus completing the All Red Line, a series of telegraph lines circumnavigating the globe completely within the British Empire. The location of Fanning Island, one of the closest formations to Hawaii, led to its annexation by the British Empire in 1888. Nearby candidates including Palmyra Island were not favoured due to the lack of adequate landing sites.

The United States eventually incorporated the Northern Line Islands into its territories, and did the same with the Phoenix Islands, which lie between Gilberts and the Line Islands, including Howland, Jarvis, and Baker islands, thus causing a territorial dispute. That was eventually resolved and they finally became part of Kiribati under the Treaty of Tarawa.

After the attack on Pearl Harbor, during World War II, Butaritari and Tarawa, and others of the Northern Gilbert group, were occupied by Japan from 1941 to 1943. Betio became an airfield and supply base. The expulsion of the Japanese military in late 1943 involved one of the bloodiest battles in US Marine Corps history. Marines landed in November 1943 and the Battle of Tarawa ensued. Ocean Island, the headquarters of the colony, was bombed, evacuated and occupied by Japan in 1942 and only freed in 1945, after the massacre of all but one of the Gilbertese on the island by the Japanese forces. Funafuti hosted then the provisional headquarters of the colony from 1942 to 1946, when Tarawa returned to host the headquarters, replacing Ocean Island.

At the end of 1945, most of the remaining inhabitants of Banaba, repatriated from Kosrae, Nauru and Tarawa, were relocated to Rabi Island, a land of Fiji that the British government had acquired in 1942 for this purpose.

On 1 January 1953, the British Western Pacific High Commissioner of the colony was transferred from Fiji to the new capital of Honiara, to the British Solomon Islands, with the Gilberts' Resident Commissioner still headquartered in Tarawa.

Further military operations in the colony occurred in the late 1950s and early 1960s when Christmas Island was used by the United States and United Kingdom for nuclear weapons testing including hydrogen bombs.

Institutions of internal self-rule were established on Tarawa from about 1967. The Ellice Islands asked for separation from the rest of the colony in 1974 and granted their own internal self-rule institutions. The separation entered into force on 1 January 1976. In 1978, the Ellice Islands became the independent nation of Tuvalu.

Independence

The Gilbert Islands gained independence as the Republic of Kiribati on 12 July 1979. Then, in September, the United States relinquished all claims to the sparsely inhabited Phoenix and Line Islands, in a 1979 treaty of friendship with Kiribati (ratified in 1983). Although the indigenous Gilbertese name for the Gilbert Islands proper is "Tungaru", the new state chose the name "Kiribati", the Gilbertese spelling of "Gilberts", because it was more modern and as an equivalent of the former colony to acknowledge the inclusion of Banaba, the Line Islands, and the Phoenix Islands. The last two archipelagoes were never initially occupied by Gilbertese until the British authorities, and later the Republic Government, resettled Gilbertese there under resettlement schemes. In 1982, the first elections since independence were held. A no confidence vote provoked the 1983 new election. In the post-independence era, overcrowding has been an issue, at least in British and aid organisations' eyes. In 1988, an announcement was made that 4,700 residents of the main island group would be resettled onto less-populated islands. In September 1994, Teburoro Tito from the opposition was elected president.

In 1995, Kiribati unilaterally moved the international date line far to the east to encompass the Line Islands group, so that the nation would no longer be divided by the date line. The move, which fulfilled one of President Tito's campaign promises, was intended to allow businesses across the expansive nation to keep the same business week. This also enabled Kiribati to become the first country to see the dawn of the third millennium, an event of significance for tourism. Tito was re-elected in 1998. In 1999, Kiribati became a full member of the United Nations, 20 years after independence. In 2002, Kiribati passed a controversial law that enabled the government to shut down newspaper publishers. The legislation followed the launching of Kiribati's first successful non-government-run newspaper. President Tito was re-elected in 2003 but was removed from office in March 2003 by a no-confidence vote and replaced by a Council of State. Anote Tong of the opposition party Boutokaan Te Koaua was elected to succeed Tito in July 2003. He was re-elected in 2007 and in 2011.

In June 2008, Kiribati officials asked Australia and New Zealand to accept Kiribati citizens as permanent refugees. Kiribati is expected to be the first country to lose all its land territory to climate change. In June 2008, the Kiribati President Anote Tong said that the country had reached "the point of no return." He added, "To plan for the day when you no longer have a country is indeed painful but I think we have to do that."

In January 2012, Anote Tong was re-elected for a third and last successive term. In early 2012, the government of Kiribati purchased the 2,200-hectare Natoavatu Estate on the second largest island of Fiji, Vanua Levu. At the time it was widely reported that the government planned to evacuate the entire population of Kiribati to Fiji. In April 2013, President Tong began urging citizens to evacuate the islands and migrate elsewhere. In May 2014, the Office of the President confirmed the purchase of some 5,460 acres of land on Vanua Levu at a cost of 9.3 million Australian dollars.

In March 2016, Taneti Maamau was elected as the new President of Kiribati. He was the fifth president since the country became independent in 1979. In June 2020, President Maamau won re-election for second four-year term. President Maamau was considered pro-China and he supported closer ties with Beijing. On 16 November 2021, the Kiribati government announced it would expand the world's largest marine protected area to economic benefits of commercial fishing. The 2022 Kiribati constitutional crisis started with the suspension of all 5 major Justices of the judiciary of Kiribati.

Politics

The Constitution of Kiribati, promulgated 12 July 1979, provides for free and open elections in a parliamentary democratic republic.

The executive branch consists of a president (te Beretitenti), a vice-president and a cabinet. The president, who is also chief of the cabinet, is directly elected by the citizens, after the legislature nominates three or four persons from among its members to be candidates in the ensuing presidential election. The president is limited to serving three four-year terms, and remains a member of the assembly. The cabinet is composed of the president, vice-president, and 13 ministers (appointed by the president) who are also ministers of parliament.

The legislative branch is the unicameral Maneaba ni Maungatabu (House of Assembly). Its members are elected, including by constitutional mandate, a nominated representative of the Banaban people in Rabi Island, Fiji (Banaba, former Ocean Island), in addition to, until 2016, the attorney general, who served as an ex officio member from 1979 to 2016. Legislators serve for a four-year term.

The constitutional provisions governing administration of justice are similar to those in other former British possessions in that the judiciary is free from governmental interference. The judicial branch is made up of the High Court (in Betio) and the Court of Appeal. The president appoints the presiding judges.

Local government is through island councils with elected members. Local affairs are handled in a manner similar to town meetings in colonial America. Island councils make their own estimates of revenue and expenditure and generally are free from central government controls. There are a total of 21 inhabited islands in Kiribati. Each inhabited island has its own council. Since independence, Kiribati is no longer divided into districts (see Subdivisions of Kiribati).

Kiribati has formal political parties but their organisation is quite informal. Ad hoc opposition groups tend to coalesce around specific issues. There is universal suffrage at age 18. Today the only recognisable parties are the Boutokaan Kiribati Moa Party, former Boutokaan te Koaua, and Tobwaan Kiribati Party.

Foreign relations

Kiribati maintains close relations with its Pacific neighbours, Australia, New Zealand, Japan and Fiji. The first three of these provide the bulk of the country's foreign aid. Taiwan and Japan also have specified-period licences to fish in Kiribati's waters. There are three resident diplomatic missions headquartered in South Tarawa: the Embassies of the Republic of China (Taiwan) until 2019, replaced by People's Republic of China in 2020 and the High Commissions of Australia and New Zealand. A US Embassy will open in 2023.

In November 1999, Kiribati agreed to allow Japan's National Space Development Agency to lease land on Kiritimati (formerly Christmas Island) for 20 years, on which to build a spaceport. The agreement stipulated that Japan was to pay US$840,000 per year and would also pay for any damage to roads and the environment. A Japanese-built downrange tracking station operates on Kiritimati and an abandoned airfield on the island was designated as the landing strip for a proposed reusable unmanned space shuttle called HOPE-X. HOPE-X, however, was eventually cancelled by Japan in 2003.

As one of the world's most vulnerable nations to the effects of global warming, Kiribati has been an active participant in international diplomatic efforts relating to climate change, most importantly the UNFCCC conferences of the parties (COP). Kiribati is a member of the Alliance of Small Island States (AOSIS), an intergovernmental organisation of low-lying coastal and small island countries.
Established in 1990, the main purpose of the alliance is to consolidate the voices of Small Island Developing States (SIDS) to address global warming. AOSIS has been very active from its inception, putting forward the first draft text in the Kyoto Protocol negotiations as early as 1994.

In 2009, President Tong attended the Climate Vulnerable Forum (V11) in the Maldives, with 10 other countries that are vulnerable to climate change, and signed the Bandos Island declaration on 10 November 2009, pledging to show moral leadership and commence greening their economies by voluntarily committing to achieving carbon neutrality.

In November 2010, Kiribati hosted the Tarawa Climate Change Conference (TCCC) to support the president of Kiribati's initiative to hold a consultative forum between vulnerable states and their partners. The conference strove to create an enabling environment for multi-party negotiations under the auspices of the UNFCCC. The conference was a successor event to the Climate Vulnerable Forum. The ultimate objective of TCCC was to reduce the number and intensity of fault lines between parties to the COP process, explore elements of agreement between the parties and thereby to support Kiribati's and other parties' contribution to COP16 held in Cancun, Mexico, from 29 November to 10 December 2010.

In 2013, President Tong spoke of climate-change induced sea level rise as "inevitable". "For our people to survive, then they will have to migrate. Either we can wait for the time when we have to move people en masse or we can prepare them—beginning from now ..." In New York in 2014, per The New Yorker, President Tong told The New York Times that "according to the projections, within this century, the water will be higher than the highest point in our lands". In 2014, President Tong finalised the purchase of a  stretch of land on Vanua Levu, one of the larger Fiji islands, 2,000 km away. A move described by Tong as an "absolute necessity" should the nation be completely submerged under water.

In 2013, attention was drawn to a claim of a Kiribati man of being a "climate change refugee" under the Convention relating to the Status of Refugees (1951). However, this claim was determined by the New Zealand High Court to be untenable. The New Zealand Court of Appeal also rejected the claim in a 2014 decision.
On further appeal, the New Zealand Supreme Court confirmed the earlier adverse rulings against the application for refugee status, but rejected the proposition "that environmental degradation resulting from climate change or other natural disasters could never create a pathway into the Refugee Convention or protected person jurisdiction". In 2017, Kiribati signed the UN treaty on the Prohibition of Nuclear Weapons.

On 20 September 2019, the government of Kiribati restored its diplomatic relationship with the People's Republic of China and simultaneously stopped its diplomatic relationship with Taiwan. China offered a 737 aircraft and ferries to Kiribati for the decision, according to Taiwan's foreign minister, Joseph Wu.

Peace Corps
From 1973 though 2008, a total of almost 500 US Peace Corps volunteers were based on the Islands, as many as 45 in a given year. Activities included assisting in the planning, design and construction of wells, libraries, and other infrastructure, and agricultural, environmental, and community health education. In 2006, volunteer placement was significantly scaled down due to the reduction of consistent air transportation to the outer islands; it was later ended because the associated ability to provide medical care to volunteers could not be assured.  In July 2022, US Vice President Harris announced plans to build a new embassy in Kiribati and Tonga and reestablish the Peace Corps presence in the region.

Law enforcement and military

Law enforcement in Kiribati is carried out by the Kiribati Police Service which is responsible for all law enforcement and paramilitary duties for the island nation. There are police posts located on all of the islands. The police have one patrol boat, the Pacific-class patrol boat RKS Teanoai II. Kiribati has no military and relies on both Australia and New Zealand for its defence.

The main prison in Kiribati is located in Betio, named the Walter Betio Prison. There is also a prison in London on Kiritimati.

Male homosexuality is illegal in Kiribati, with a penalty up to 14 years in prison, according to a historical British law, but this law is not enforced. Kiribati has not yet followed the lead of the United Kingdom, following its Wolfenden report, to decriminalise acts of male homosexuality, beginning with provisions in the UK's Sexual Offences Act 1957. Female homosexuality is legal, but lesbians may face violence and discrimination. However, employment discrimination on the basis of sexual orientation is prohibited.

Administrative divisions 

There are 21 inhabited islands in Kiribati. Kiribati can be geographically divided into three archipelagoes or groups of islands, which have no administrative functions. They are:
 Gilbert Islands
 Phoenix Islands, in one of the largest marine protected areas on Earth (was the largest from 2008 to 2010)
 Line Islands

The original districts before independence were:
 Banaba (Ocean Island)
 Tarawa Atoll
 Northern Gilbert Islands
 Central Gilbert Island
 Southern Gilbert Islands
 Line Islands

Four of the former districts (including Tarawa) lie in the Gilbert Islands, where most of the country's population lives. Five of the Line Islands are uninhabited (Malden Island, Starbuck Island, Millenium Island, Vostok Island and Flint Island). The Phoenix Islands are uninhabited except for Kanton, and have no representation. Banaba itself is sparsely inhabited now. There is also a non-elected representative of the Banabans on Rabi Island in Fiji.

Each of the 21 inhabited islands has its own local council that takes care of daily affairs. There is one council for each inhabited island, with two exceptions: Tarawa Atoll has three councils: Betio Town Council,  (TUC) (for the rest of South Tarawa) and Eutan Tarawa Council (ETC) (for North Tarawa); and Tabiteuea has two councils.

Geography 

Kiribati consists of 32 atolls and one solitary island (Banaba), extending into the eastern and western hemispheres, as well as the northern and southern hemispheres. Its extensive exclusive economic zone covers three, non-contiguous, traditional geographic subregions: Banaba (Melanesian-Micronesian area), the Gilbert Islands (Micronesia) and the Line and Phoenix Islands (Polynesia). The groups of islands are:
 Banaba: an isolated island between Nauru and the Gilbert Islands

Banaba (or Ocean Island) is a raised-coral island. It was once a rich source of phosphates, but was exhausted in mining before independence. The rest of the land in Kiribati consists of the sand and reef rock islets of atolls or coral islands, which rise only one or two metres above sea level.

The soil is thin and calcareous. It has a low water-holding capacity and low organic matter and nutrient content—except for calcium, sodium, and magnesium. Banaba is one of the least suitable places for agriculture in the world.

Kiritimati (previously Christmas Island) in the Line Islands is the world's largest atoll. Based on a 1995 realignment of the International Date Line, the Line Islands were the first area to enter into a new year, including year 2000. For that reason, Caroline Island was renamed Millennium Island in 1997. The majority of Kiribati, including the capital, is not first, for example New Zealand (UTC+13 in January) has an earlier new year.

Environmental issues 

According to the Pacific Regional Environment Programme (previously South Pacific Regional Environment Programme), two small uninhabited Kiribati islets, Tebua Tarawa and Abanuea, disappeared underwater in 1999. The United Nations Intergovernmental Panel on Climate Change predicts that sea levels will rise by about 50 cm (20 in) by 2100 due to global warming and a further rise would be inevitable. It is thus likely that within a century the nation's arable land will become subject to increased soil salination and will be largely submerged.

The exposure of Kiribati to changes in sea levels is exacerbated by the Pacific decadal oscillation, which is a climate switch phenomenon that results in changes from periods of La Niña to periods of El Niño. This has an effect on sea levels. For example, in 2000, there was a switch from periods of downward pressure of El Niño on sea levels to an upward pressure of La Niña on sea levels, which upward pressure causes more frequent and higher high tide levels. The Perigean spring tide (often called a king tide) can result in seawater flooding low-lying areas of the islands of Kiribati.

The atolls and reef islands can respond to changes in sea-level. Paul Kench at the University of Auckland in New Zealand and Arthur Webb at the South Pacific Applied Geoscience Commission in Fiji released a study in 2010 on the dynamic response of atolls and reef islands in the central Pacific. Kiribati was mentioned in the study, and Webb and Kench found that the three major urbanised islands in Kiribati—Betio, Bairiki and Nanikai—increased by 30% (36 hectares), 16.3% (5.8 hectares) and 12.5% (0.8 hectares), respectively.

The study by Paul Kench and Arthur Webb recognises that the islands are extremely vulnerable to sea level rise, and concluded that: "This study did not measure vertical growth of the island surface nor does it suggest there is any change in the height of the islands. Since land height has not changed the vulnerability of the greater part of the land area of each island to submergence due to sea level rise is also unchanged and these low-lying atolls remain immediately and extremely vulnerable to inundation or sea water flooding."

The Climate Change in the Pacific Report of 2011 describes Kiribati as having a low risk of cyclones; however in March 2015 Kiribati experienced flooding and destruction of seawalls and coastal infrastructure as the result of Cyclone Pam, a Category 5 cyclone that devastated Vanuatu. Kiribati remains exposed to the risk that cyclones can strip the low-lying islands of their vegetation and soil.

Gradual sea-level rise also allows for coral polyp activity to raise the atolls with the sea level. However, if the increase in sea level occurs at a rate faster than coral growth, or if polyp activity is damaged by ocean acidification, then the resilience of the atolls and reef islands is less certain. Also, coral bleaching has occurred on more than 60% of the coral reefs in the Maldives.

The Kiribati Adaptation Program (KAP), started in 2003, is a US$5.5 million initiative that was originally enacted by the national government of Kiribati with the support of the Global Environment Facility (GEF), the World Bank, the United Nations Development Program, and the Japanese government. Australia later joined the coalition, donating US$1.5 million to the effort. The program aims to take place over six years, supporting measures that reduce Kiribati's vulnerability to the effects of climate change and sea level rise by raising awareness of climate change, assessing and protecting available water resources, and managing inundation.
At the start of the Adaptation Program, representatives from each of the inhabited atolls identified key climatic changes that had taken place over the past 20–40 years and proposed coping mechanisms to deal with these changes under four categories of urgency of need. The program is now focusing on the country's most vulnerable sectors in the most highly populated areas.
Initiatives include improving water supply management in and around Tarawa; coastal management protection measures such as mangrove re-plantation and protection of public infrastructure; strengthening laws to reduce coastal erosion; and population settlement planning to reduce personal risks.

The government has taken specific action to ensure food security, as sea level rise, drought, and overfishing have created food and water shortages. This has involved diversifying food sources and ensuring existing resources are managed sustainably.

Climate

Kiribati has a tropical rainforest climate (Af). From November to April, western gales bring rain.

Kiribati wet season (te Auu-Meang) also recognized as the Tropical cyclone (TC) (te Angibuaka) season starts from November to April every year. Kiribati therefore typically experiences more extreme weather events associated with Tropical disturbances (TD) or Tropical cyclones during te Auu-Meang. But Tropical cyclones rarely develop or pass along the equator where Kiribati is located. However, based on past events, Kiribati has been impacted from distant Tropical cyclone (TC) and the impacts were observed while the systems are in their development stages (Tropical Low/disturbance) or even before they reach Tropical cyclone category.

The fair season starts when Ten Rimwimata (Antares) appears in the sky after sunset, from May to November, when more gentle winds and currents and less rain. Then towards December, when Nei Auti (Pleiades) replaces Antares, the season of sudden westerly winds and more heavy rain discourages any far travel from island to island.

Kiribati does not experience cyclones but effects may occasionally be experienced during cyclone seasons affecting nearby Pacific Island countries such as Fiji.

Precipitation varies significantly between islands. For example, the annual average is 3,000 mm (120 in) in the north and 500 mm (20 in) in the south of the Gilbert Islands. Most of these islands are in the dry belt of the equatorial oceanic climatic zone and experience prolonged droughts.

Ecology 

Kiribati contains three ecosystems: Central Polynesian tropical moist forests, Eastern Micronesia tropical moist forests, and Western Polynesian tropical moist forests.

Because of the relatively young geological age of the islands and atolls and high level of soil salination, the flora of Kiribati is somewhat unhealthy. The Gilbert Islands contain about 83 indigenous and 306 introduced plants, whereas the corresponding numbers for Line and Phoenix Islands are 67 and 283. None of these species are endemic, and about half of the indigenous ones have a limited distribution and became endangered or nearly extinct due to human activities such as phosphate mining.

Coconut, pandanus palms and breadfruit trees are the most common wild plants, whereas the five most cultivated crops but the traditional Babai, Cyrtosperma merkusii, are imported Chinese cabbage, pumpkin, tomato, watermelon and cucumber. Over eighty per cent of the population participates in either farming or fishing.

Seaweed farming is an important part of the economy , with two major species Eucheuma alcarezii and Eucheuma spinosium introduced to the local lagoons from the Philippines in 1977. It competes with collection of the black-lipped pearl oyster (Pinctada margaritifera) and shellfish, which are dominated by the strombid gastropod (Strombus luhuanus) and Anadara cockles (Anadara uropigimelana), whereas the stocks of the giant clam (Tridacna gigas) have been largely exhausted.

Kiribati has a few land mammals, none being indigenous or endemic. They include the Polynesian rat (Rattus exulans), dogs, cats and pigs. Among the 75 bird species, the Bokikokiko (Acrocephalus aequinoctialis) is endemic to Kiritimati.

There are 600–800 species of inshore and pelagic finfish, some 200 species of corals and about 1000 species of shellfish. Fishing mostly targets the family Scombridae, particularly the skipjack tuna and yellowfin tuna as well as flying fish (Cypselurus spp.).

Dogs were already accompanying the first inhabitants but were re-introduced by European settlers: they have continued to grow in numbers and are roaming in traditional packs, particularly around South Tarawa.

Economy

Kiribati has few natural resources. Commercially viable phosphate deposits on Banaba were exhausted at the time of independence. Copra and fish now represent the bulk of production and exports. Kiribati has the lowest GDP out of any sovereign state in Oceania, and is considered one of the least developed countries in the world.

In one form or another, Kiribati gets a large portion of its income from abroad. Examples include fishing licences, development assistance, workers' remittances, especially the seafarers issued from Marine Training Centre, and a few tourists. Given Kiribati's limited domestic production ability, it must import nearly all of its essential foodstuffs and manufactured items; it depends on these external sources of income for financing.

The economy of Kiribati benefits from international development assistance programs. The multilateral donors providing development assistance in 2009 were the European Union (A$9 million), the United Nations Development Programme (A$3.7 million), UNICEF, and the World Health Organization (A$100,000). The bilateral donors providing development assistance in 2009 were Australia (A$11 million), Japan (A$2 million), New Zealand (A$6.6 million), Taiwan (A$10.6 million), and other donors providing A$16.2 million, including technical assistance grants from the Asian Development Bank.

The major donors in 2010/2011 were Australia (A$15 million), Taiwan (A$11 million); New Zealand (A$6 million), the World Bank (A$4 million) and the Asian Development Bank.

In 1956, Gilbert and Ellice Islands established a sovereign wealth fund to act as a store of wealth for the country's earnings from phosphate mining.
In 2008, the Revenue Equalization Reserve Fund was valued at US$400 million. The RERF assets declined from A$637 million (420% of GDP) in 2007 to A$570.5 million (350% of GDP) in 2009 as the result of the global financial crisis and exposure to failed Icelandic banks. In addition, draw-downs were made by the government of Kiribati to finance budgetary shortfalls during this period.

In May 2011, the IMF country report assessment of the economy of Kiribati is that "After two years of contraction, the economy recovered in the second half of 2010 and inflation pressure dissipated. It is estimated to have grown by 1.75% for the year. Despite a weather-related drop in copra production, private sector activity appears to have picked up, especially in retail. Tourist arrivals rebounded by 20% compared to 2009, although from a very low base.
Despite the rise in world food and fuel prices, inflation has bounced from 2008 crisis-highs into negative territory, reflecting the strong appreciation of the Australian dollar, which is used as the domestic currency, and a decline in the world price of rice. Credit growth in the overall economy declined in 2009 as economic activity stalled. But it started to pick up in the second half of 2010 as the recovery gained traction".

A major Australian bank, ANZ, maintains a presence on Kiribati with a number of branches and ATM units.

Ornamental fish
Kiribati is a major exporter of hand-caught ornamental fish. There are eight licensed operators based on Kiritimati (Christmas Island). At the end of 2005, the number of pet fish exported was 110,000. All operators have a land-based facility but fish are kept in containers on the reef until the day before the shipment. This is to reduce the running cost and the mortality of pet fish to be exported. The flame angelfish (Centropyge loriculus) is the major species exported.

Transport

Kiribati has had two domestic airlines: Air Kiribati and Coral Sun Airways. Both airlines are based in Tarawa's Bonriki International Airport and serve destinations across the Gilbert Islands and Line Islands only: Banaba and the Phoenix Islands are not served by the domestic carriers.

Cassidy International Airport on Kiritimati has an international service provided by Fiji Airways: Nadi to Cassidy Airport and then to Honolulu.

Communications and media 
The islands’ remote location in the Central Pacific at approximately the International Date Line and spanning hundreds of miles north and south of the equator has meant that communications between them has always been challenging and conducted primarily by radio and print media. TV Kiribati Ltd, was owned by the government operated between 2004 and mid-2012, but could not reach all of the Islands. Radio Kiribati, based on Tarawa and operated by the government's Broadcasting and Publications Authority (BPA) on 1440 kHz AM is the only form of mass media that reaches all the major islands. Transmission hours are limited and local content in Gilbertese is supplemented by English summaries and BBC News. The BPA and a private broadcaster also operate FM stations accessible on Tarawa.

Inter-island communications for many years relied on a centralized shortwave radio network operated by Telecom Services Kiribati, Ltd (TSKL) based in each Island's Council Headquarters. Numerous issues including low availability, maintenance, privacy, and only one per island led TSKL to adopt satellite-based telephones. However, the system is more expensive and still only located at Council Headquarters.

Print weeklies in Gilbertese include the Te Uekara published by the government, Te Mauri published by the Kiribati Protestant Church, and the Kiribati Independent, published from Auckland as well as the Kiribati Newstar, published in English.

In December 2019, SpaceX launched the Kacific1 broadband satellite that provides 100Mbit/s mobile and broadband service to 25 countries throughout to the Asia-Pacific region including Kiribati. Three of the satellite's 56 spot beams provide overlapping coverage of the Gilbert Islands and Tuvalu; however, the more eastern regions of the country, the Phoenix and Line Islands, are outside of the satellite's coverage.

The Southern Cross NEXT cable system, which entered service in July 2022, connects the US to Australia and provides service to Kiribati (Tarawa) through the  Kiritimati Branch with one fiber pair. The network, which is an upgrade to the existing Southern Cross Cable, also connects to Samoa, Fiji, and New Zealand.

In June 2021, the World Bank-backed procurement for the East Micronesian Cable system was cancelled due to security concerns. The undersea fiberoptic system, which would have originated in Guam, was "designed to improve the communications in the island nations of Nauru, Kiribati and Federated States of Micronesia (FSM)." In January of 2023, ministers from the three Pacific island nations signed a join communiqué for moving forward with the stalled project. Funded by the U.S., Japan and Australia the project is valued at $70 million. In early 2023, it was reported that Kiribati became the first Pacific island nation to receive Starlink services.

Demographics

The November 2020 census showed a population of 119,940. About 90% lived in the Gilbert Islands, with 52.9% of them on South Tarawa, including Betio, the biggest township.

Until recently, people lived mostly in villages with populations between 50 and 3,000 on the outer islands. Most houses are made of materials obtained from coconut and pandanus trees. Frequent droughts and infertile soil hinder reliable large-scale agriculture, so the islanders have largely turned to the sea for livelihood and subsistence. Most are outrigger sailors and fishermen. Copra plantations serve as a second source of employment. In recent years, large numbers of citizens have moved to the more urban island capital of Tarawa, where Betio is the largest town and South Tarawa reunites larger towns like Bikenibeu or Teaoraereke. Increasing urbanisation has raised the population of South Tarawa to 63,017.

Ethnicity 

The native people of Kiribati are called I-Kiribati. Ethnically, the I-Kiribati are Oceanians and Micronesians, a sub-ethnicity of Austronesians. Recent archaeological evidence indicates that Austronesians originally settled the islands thousands of years ago . Around the 14th century, Fijians, Samoans, and Tongans invaded the islands, thus diversifying the ethnic range and introducing Polynesian linguistic traits. Intermarriage among all ancestral groups, however, has led to a population reasonably homogeneous in appearance and traditions.

Languages 
The people of Kiribati speak Gilbertese, an Oceanic language. English is the other official language, but is not used very often outside the island capital of Tarawa. It is more likely that some English words are mixed in their use with Gilbertese. Older generations of I-Kiribati tend to use more complicated versions of the language. Several words in Gilbertese have been adopted from European settlers, for instance, kamea is one of the Gilbertese words for dog, kiri being the Oceanic one, which has its origins in the I-Kiribati people hearing the European settlers saying "come here" to their dogs, and adopting that as kamea.

Many other loanwords have been adopted (like buun, spoon, moko, smoke, beeki, pig, batoro, bottle) but some typical Gilbertese words are quite common, even for European objects (like wanikiba, plane – the flying canoe, rebwerebwe, motorbike – for the motor noise, kauniwae, shoes – the cow for the feet).

Religion 

Christianity is the major religion in Kiribati, having been lately introduced by missionaries, because of its remoteness and the absence of any significant European presence until the latter half of the 19th century. The population is predominantly Roman Catholic (58.9%), with two main Protestant denominations (Kiribati Protestant Church 8.4% and Kiribati Uniting Church 21.2%) accounting for 29.6%. The Church of Jesus Christ of Latter-day Saints (5.6%), Baháʼí Faith (2.1%), Seventh-day Adventist Church (2.1%), Pentecostals, Jehovah's Witnesses, and other small faiths together account for less than 2% (2020 census).

Health

The Gilbert Islands where 90% of the Kiribati population live, boast some of the highest population densities in the Pacific, rivalling, without any tall building, cities like Hong Kong or Singapore. This overcrowding produces a great amount of pollution, worsening the quality and length of life. Due to insufficient sanitation and water filtration systems, worsened by the fragility of the water lens of the atolls and by climate change, only about 66% have access to clean water. Waterborne diseases grow at record levels throughout the islands. Poor sanitation has led to an increase in cases of conjunctivitis, diarrhoea, dysentery, and fungal infections. Around 57% of adults smoke tobacco products on a regular basis, the highest proportion in the world. Due to this and other "lifestyle diseases," such as type 2 diabetes, there has been a drastic spike in amputations on the islands, doubling in a few years.

As a consequence, the population of Kiribati has a quite low life expectancy at birth of 68.46 years. Even if this data is of only 66.9 years, provided elsewhere, Kiribati ranks last in life expectancy out of the 20 nations of Oceania. This life expectancy is 64.3 for males, and 69.5 for females and there is an infant mortality rate of 41 deaths per 1,000 live births. Tuberculosis has a small presence in the country, with 365 cases per 100,000 a year. Government expenditure on health was at US$268 per capita (PPP) in 2006. In 1990–2007, there were 23 physicians per 100,000 persons. Since the arrival of Cuban doctors in 2006, the infant mortality rate has decreased significantly.

Most health problems are related to consumption of semi-raw seafood, limited food storage facilities, and bacterial contamination of fresh water supplies. In the early 2000s, between 1 and 7% of the population, depending on the island, were annually treated for food poisoning in a hospital. Modernization and cross-cultural exchange of the late 20th century brought new issues of unhealthy diet and lifestyle, heavy smoking, especially among the young, and external infections, including HIV/AIDS. Kiribati is the country with the third highest prevalence of smoking in the world, with 54–57% of the population reported as smokers.

Fresh water remains a concern of Kiribati – during the dry season (Aumaiaki), water has been drilled for instead of using rain water tanks. In recent years, there has been a longer than usual Aumaikai season resulting in additional water having to be drilled from beneath the water table. This has introduced water-borne illnesses, compounding the health problems within Kiribati.

The Human Rights Measurement Initiative finds that Kiribati is fulfilling 77.2% of what it should be fulfilling for the right to health based on its level of income. When looking at the right to health with respect to children, Kiribati achieves 93.8% of what is expected based on its current income. In regards to the right to health amongst the adult population, the country achieves 92.2% of what is expected based on the nation's level of income. Kiribati falls into the "very bad" category when evaluating the right to reproductive health because the nation is fulfilling only 45.5% of what the nation is expected to achieve based on the resources (income) it has available.

Education

Primary education is free and compulsory for the first 9 years, beginning at age 6. Mission schools are slowly being absorbed into the government primary school system. Higher education is expanding; students may seek technical, teacher or marine training, or study in other countries. Most choosing to do the latter have gone to Fiji to attend the University of the South Pacific, and those wishing to complete medical training have been sent to Australia, New Zealand or Cuba.

The education system is organised as follows:
Preschool for childhood from 1 to 5 years;
Primary school (Class 1 to 6) from 6 to 11 years;
Junior secondary school (Form 1 to 3) from 12 to 14;
Senior secondary school (Form 4 to 7) from 15 to 18.

Kiribati Ministry of Education is the education ministry. The government high schools are King George V and Elaine Bernacchi School, Tabiteuea North Senior Secondary School, and Melaengi Tabai Secondary School. 13 high schools are operated by Christian churches.

The University of the South Pacific has a campus in Teaoraereke for distant/flexible learning, but also to provide preparatory studies towards obtaining certificates, diplomas and degrees at other campus sites.

The other prominent schools in Kiribati are:
 the Marine Training Centre in Betio;
 the Kiribati Institute of Technology;
 the Kiribati Fisheries Training Centre;
 the Kiribati School of Nursing;
 the Kiribati Police Academy;
 the Kiribati Teachers College.

Culture

Songs (te anene) and above all, dances (te mwaie), are held in high regard.

Music

Kiribati folk music is generally based on chanting or other forms of vocalising, accompanied by body percussion. Public performances in modern Kiribati are generally performed by a seated chorus, accompanied by a guitar. However, during formal performances of the standing dance (Te Kaimatoa) or the hip dance (Te Buki), a wooden box is used as a percussion instrument. This box is constructed to give a hollow and reverberating tone when struck simultaneously by a chorus of men sitting around it. Traditional songs are often love-themed, but there are also competitive, religious, children's, patriotic, war and wedding songs. There are also stick dances which accompany legends and semi-historical stories. These stick dances or "tirere" (pronounced seerere) are performed only during major festivals.

Dance

The uniqueness of Kiribati when compared with other forms of Pacific island dance is its emphasis on the outstretched arms of the dancer and the sudden birdlike movement of the head. The Frigate bird (Fregata minor) on the Kiribati flag refers to this bird-like style of Kiribati dancing. Most dances are in the standing or sitting position with movement limited and staggered. Smiling whilst dancing is generally considered vulgar within the context of Kiribati dancing. This is due to its origin of not being solely as a form of entertainment but as a form of storytelling and a display of the skill, beauty and endurance of the dancer.

Cuisine 
Traditionally, the staple diet of the I-Kiribati was the abundance of seafood and coconuts. Starch based carbohydrate sources were not plentiful due to the hostile climate of the atolls with only the northernmost atolls being viable for constant agriculture. The national crop bwabwai was only eaten during special celebrations along with pork. 

To complement the rather low consumption of carbohydrates in their diets, the I-Kiribati processed the sap and fruit of the abundant Pandanus and Coconut trees into different beverages and foods such as te karewe (fresh daily sap of the coconut tree) or te tuae (dried pandanus cake) and te kabubu (dried pandanus flour) from pandanus fruit pulp and te kamaimai (coconut sap syrup) from coconut sap.

After World War II, rice became a daily staple in most households which is still the case today. Majority of seafood, fish in particular is eaten sashimi style with either coconut sap, soy sauce or vinegar based dressings in use often combined with chillies and onions.

Coconut crabs and mud crabs are traditionally given to breastfeeding mothers, with the belief that the meat stimulates the production of good quality breastmilk.

Sport

Kiribati has competed at the Commonwealth Games since 1998 and the Summer Olympics since 2004. It sent three competitors to its first Olympics, two sprinters and a weightlifter. Kiribati won its first ever Commonwealth Games medal at the 2014 Commonwealth Games when weightlifter David Katoatau won Gold in the 105 kg Group.

Football is the most popular sport. Kiribati Islands Football Federation (KIFF) is an associate member of the Oceania Football Confederation, but not of world-governing body FIFA. Instead, they are member of ConIFA. Kiribati National team has played ten matches, all of which it has lost, and all at the Pacific Games from 1979 to 2011. The Kiribati football stadium is Bairiki National Stadium, which has a capacity of 2,500.

The  is home to a number of local sporting teams.

Outside perspectives
Edward Carlyon Eliot, who was Resident Commissioner of the Gilbert and Ellice Islands (now Kiribati & Tuvalu) from 1913 to 1920 describes this period in his book Broken Atoms (autobiographical reminiscences) Pub. G. Bles, London, 1938.

Sir Arthur Grimble wrote about his time working in the British colonial service in Kiribati (then the Gilbert Islands) from 1914 to 1932 in two popular books A Pattern of Islands (1952) and Return to the Islands (1957). He also undertook academic studies of Gilbertese culture.

John Smith, the last governor of the Gilbert and Ellice Islands wrote his memoir An Island in the Autumn (2011).

J. Maarten Troost's more recent autobiographical experiences in Tarawa are documented in his book The Sex Lives of Cannibals (2004).

Alice Piciocchi's illustrated essay, Kiribati. Cronache illustrate da una terra (s)perduta, (2016) Milan: 24 ORE Cultura, also translated into French (2018, éditions du Rouergue), tries to write and portray a comprehensive encyclopaedic book of nowadays Kiribati.

See also

List of towns and villages in Kiribati
Outline of Kiribati

Notes

References

Bibliography

 
 
 
 
 
 
 
  (also in French)

External links

 Map of Kiribati from World Maps
 Kiribati National Tourism Office
 Parliament of Kiribati
 Kiribati National Climate Change Portal
 Chief of State and Cabinet Members

General information 
 Kiribati. The World Factbook. Central Intelligence Agency.
 Kiribati from UCB Libraries GovPubs
 
 Kiribati from the BBC News
 
 Phoenix Islands Protected Area 
 Paradise Lost? (A recent PBS/NOW program on global warming)
 Exhibit: The Alfred Agate Collection: The United States Exploring Expedition, 1838–1842 from the Navy Art Gallery
 Birds of Kiribati from Conservation International

 
Republics in the Commonwealth of Nations
Countries in Micronesia
Countries in Oceania
British Western Pacific Territories
English-speaking countries and territories
Island countries
Least developed countries
Member states of the Commonwealth of Nations
Member states of the United Nations
Small Island Developing States
States and territories established in 1979
Christian states
World War II sites
1979 establishments in Oceania